The) is the ongoing transition by Germany to a low carbon, environmentally sound, reliable, and affordable energy supply. The new system intends to rely heavily on renewable energy (particularly wind, photovoltaics, and hydroelectricity), energy efficiency, and energy demand management.

The last nuclear power plant will shut down in 2022; all existing coal-fired generation will be retired by 2038. Legislative support for the Energiewende was passed in late 2010 and included greenhouse gas (GHG) reductions of 80–95% by 2050 (relative to 1990) and a renewable energy target of 60% by 2050.

Germany has already made significant progress on its GHG emissions reduction target prior to the introduction of the program, achieving a 27% decrease between 1990 and 2014. However the country would need to maintain an average GHG emissions abatement rate of 3.5% per year to reach its Energiewende goal, equal to the maximum historical value thus far.

A controversial part of the program was the phasing out of Germany's nuclear reactors, to be complete by 2022, with the aim of reaching a 100% renewable energy system. This process is mostly completed, with three reactors remaining connected to the grid (as of January 2022). Germany's overall energy mix still has high  intensity due to large share of coal and fossil gas.

Etymology 

The term Energiewende is regularly used in English language publications without being translated (a loanword).

The term Energiewende was first contained in the title of a 1980 publication by the German Öko-Institut, calling for the complete abandonment of nuclear and petroleum energy.
The most groundbreaking claim was that economic growth was possible without increased energy consumption. On 16February 1980, the German Federal Ministry of the Environment also hosted a symposium in Berlin, called Energiewende – Atomausstieg und Klimaschutz (Energy Transition: Nuclear Phase-Out and Climate Protection). The Öko-Institut was funded by both environmental and religious organizations, and the importance of religious and conservative figures like  and Peter Ahmels was crucial.  In the following decades, the term Energiewende expanded in scope – in its present form it dates back to at least 2002.

Energiewende designated a significant change in energy policy. The term encompassed a reorientation of policy from demand to supply and a shift from centralized to distributed generation (for example, producing heat and power in small cogeneration units), which should replace overproduction and avoidable energy consumption with energy-saving measures and increased efficiency.

In a broader sense, this transition also entailed a democratization of energy. In the traditional energy industry, a few large companies with large centralized power stations were perceived as dominating the market as an oligopoly and consequently amassing a worrisome level of both economic and political power. Renewable energies, in contrast, can, in theory, be established in a decentralized manner. Public wind farms and solar parks can involve many citizens directly in energy production. Photovoltaic systems can even be set up by individuals. Municipal utilities can also benefit citizens financially, while the conventional energy industry profits a relatively small number of shareholders. Also significant, the decentralized structure of renewable energies enables creation of value locally and minimizes capital outflows from a region. Renewable energy sources therefore play an increasingly important role in municipal energy policy, and local governments often promote them.

Status 

The key policy document outlining the Energiewende was published by the German government in September 2010, some six months before the Fukushima nuclear accident.  Legislative support was passed in September 2010. On 6 June 2011, following Fukushima, the government removed the use of nuclear power as a bridging technology as part of their policy. The program was later described as "Germany's vendetta against nuclear" and attributed to the growing influence of ideologically anti-nuclear green movements in mainstream politics.  In 2014, then-Federal Minister for Economic Affairs and Energy Sigmar Gabriel lobbied Swedish company Vattenfall to continue investments in brown coal mines in Germany, explaining that "we cannot simultaneously quit nuclear energy and coal-based power generation". A similar statement by Gabriel was recalled by James Hansen in his 2009 book "Storms of my grandchildren" — Gabriel argued that "coal use was essential because Germany was going to phase out nuclear power. Period. It was a political decision and it was non-negotiable".

In 2011, the Ethical Committee on Secure Energy Supply was tasked with performing an assessment of feasibility of the nuclear phase-out and transition to renewable energy, and it concluded:

In 2019, Germany's Federal Court of Auditors determined the program had cost €160 billion over the last 5 years and criticized the expenses for being "in extreme disproportion to the results". Despite widespread initial support, the program is perceived as "expensive, chaotic and unfair", and a "massive failure" as of 2019.

Russian fossil gas has been perceived as a "safe, cheap an temporary" fuel to replace nuclear power in the initial phase of Energiewende, as part of German policy of integrating Russia with European Union through mutually beneficial trade relations. German dependency on Russian gas imports was presented as "mutual dependency".

Initial phase 2013-2016 

After the 2013 federal elections, the new CDU/CSU and SPD coalition government continued the Energiewende, with only minor modification of its goals in the coalition agreement.  An intermediate target was introduced of a 55–60% share of renewable energy in gross electricity consumption in 2035. These targets were described as "ambitious". The Berlin-based policy institute Agora Energiewende noted that "while the German approach is not unique worldwide, the speed and scope of the Energiewende are exceptional". A particular characteristic of the Energiewende compared to other planned energy transition was the expectation that the transition is driven by citizens and not large energy utilities. Germany's switch to renewables was described as "democratization of the energy supply". The Energiewende also sought a greater transparency in relation to national energy policy formation.

As of 2013, Germany was spending €1.5 billion per year on energy research in an effort to solve the technical and social issues raised by the transition, which are provided by the individual federal states, universities and the government, which provided €400 million per year. The government's contribution was increased to €800 million in 2017.

Important aspects included:

In addition, there was be an associated research and development drive. A chart showing German energy legislation in 2016 is available.

These targets went well beyond European Union legislation and the national policies of other European states. The policy objectives have been embraced by the German federal government and has resulted in a huge expansion of renewables, particularly wind power. Germany's share of renewables has increased from around 5% in 1999 to 22.9% in 2012, surpassing the OECD average of 18% usage of renewables.
Producers have been guaranteed a fixed feed-in tariff for 20 years, guaranteeing a fixed income. Energy co-operatives have been created, and efforts were made to decentralize control and profits.   However, in some cases poor investment designs have caused bankruptcies and low returns, and unrealistic promises have been shown to be far from reality.

Nuclear power plants were closed, and the existing nine plants were scheduled to close earlier than planned, in 2022.

One factor that has inhibited efficient employment of new renewable energy has been the lack of an accompanying investment in power infrastructure to bring the power to market. It is believed 8,300 km of power lines must be built or upgraded.  In 2010 legislation has been passed seeking construction and upgrade of 7'700 km of new grid lines, but only 950 km have been built by 2019 — and in 2017 only 30 km has been built.

The different German States have varying attitudes to the construction of new power lines. Industry has had their rates frozen and so the increased costs of the Energiewende have been passed on to consumers, who have had rising electricity bills. Germans in 2013 had some of the highest electricity prices (including taxes) in Europe. In comparison, its neighbors (Poland, Sweden, Denmark and nuclear-reliant France) have some of the lowest costs (excluding taxes) in the EU.

On 1 August 2014, a revised Renewable Energy Sources Act entered into force.  Specific deployment corridors stipulated the extent to which renewable energy is to be expanded in the future and the funding rates (feed-in tariffs) will no longer be fixed by the government, but will be determined by auction.

Market redesign was perceived as a key part of the Energiewende.  The German electricity market needed to be reworked to suit.
Among other things, wind and solar power cannot be principally refinanced under the current marginal cost based market. Carbon pricing is also central to the Energiewende, and the European Union Emissions Trading Scheme (EU ETS) needs to be reformed to create a genuine scarcity of certificates.
The German federal government is calling for such reform.
Most of the computer scenarios used to analyse the Energiewende rely on a substantial carbon price to drive the transition to low-carbon technologies.

Coal-fired generation needs to be retired as part of the Energiewende.  Some argue for an explicit negotiated phase-out of coal plants, along the lines of the well-publicized nuclear phase-out, but as German minister of economy noted, "we cannot shut down both our nuclear and coal-fired power plants". Coal comprised 42% of electricity generation in 2015.  If Germany is to limit its contribution to a global temperature increase to 1.5°C above pre-industrial levels, as declared in the 2015 Paris Agreement, a complete phase-out of fossil fuels together with a shift to 100% renewable energy is required by about 2040.

The Energiewende is made up of various technical building blocks and assumptions.  Electricity storage, while too expensive at the beginning of the program, was hoped to become a useful technology in the future. As of 2019 however as number of potential storage projects (power-to-gas, hydrogen storage and others) are still in prototype phase with losses up to 40% of the stored energy in the existing small scale installations.

Energy efficiency has a key but currently under-recognised role to play. Improved energy efficiency is one of Germany's official targets.  Greater integration with adjoining national electricity networks can offer mutual benefits — indeed, systems with high shares of renewables can use geographical diversity to offset intermittency.

Germany invested €1.5billion in energy research in 2013.
Of that the German federal government spent €820million supporting projects ranging from basic research to applications.  The federal government also foresees an export role for German expertise in the area.

The social and political dimensions of the Energiewende have been subject to study. Strunz argues that the underlying technological, political and economic structures will need to change radically — a process he calls regime shift.
Schmid, Knopf, and Pechan analyse the actors and institutions that will be decisive in the Energiewende and how latency in the national electricity infrastructure may restrict progress.

On 3 December 2014, the German federal government released its National Action Plan on Energy Efficiency (NAPE) in order to improve the uptake of energy efficiency.
The areas covered are the energy efficiency of buildings, energy conservation for companies, consumer energy efficiency, and transport energy efficiency.  German industry is expected to make a sizeable contribution.

An official federal government report on progress under the Energiewende, updated for 2014, notes that:
 energy consumption fell by 4.7% in 2014 (from 2013) and at petajoules reached it lowest level since 1990
 renewable generation is the number-one source of electricity
 energy efficiency increased by an average annual 1.6% between 2008 and 2014
 final energy consumption in the transport sector was 1.7% higher in 2014 than in 2005
 for the first time in more than ten years, electricity prices for household customers fell at the beginning of 2015

A commentary on the progress report expands on many of the issues raised.

Slowdown from 2016 

Slow progress on transmission network reinforcement has led to a deferment of new windfarms in northern Germany.  The German cabinet earlier approved costly underground cabling in October 2015 in a bid to dispel local resistance against above-ground pylons and to speed up the expansion process.

Analysis by Agora Energiewende in late-2016 suggests that Germany will probably miss several of its key Energiewende targets, despite recent reforms to the Renewable Energy Sources Act and the wholesale electricity market.  The goal to cut emissions by 40% by 2020 "will most likely be missed... if no further measures are taken" and the 55–60% share of renewable energy in gross electricity consumption by 2035 is "unachievable" with the current plans for renewables expansion.  In November 2016, Agora Energiewende reported on the impact of the new  and several other related new laws.  It concludes that this new legislation will bring "fundamental changes" for large sections of the energy industry, but have limited effect on the economy and on consumers.

The 2016 Climate Action Plan for Germany, adopted on 14November 2016, introduced sector targets for greenhouse gas (GHG) emissions.  The goal for the energy sector is shown in the table. The plan states that the energy supply must be "almost completely decarbonised" by 2050, with renewables as its main source.  For the electricity sector, "in the long-term, electricity generation must be based almost entirely on renewable energies" and "the share of wind and solar power in total electricity production will rise significantly". Notwithstanding, during the transition, "less carbon-intensive natural gas power plants and the existing most modern coal power plants play an important role as interim technologies".

The fifth monitoring report on the Energiewende for 2015 was published in December 2016. The expert commission which wrote the report warns that Germany will probably miss its 2020 climate targets and believes that this could threaten the credibility of the entire endeavor. The commission puts forward a number of measures to address the slowdown, including a flat national CO2 price imposed across all sectors, a greater focus on transport, and full market exposure for renewable generation. Regarding the carbon price, the commission thinks that a reformed EUETS would be better, but that achieving agreement across Europe is unlikely.

After 2017 

Since 2017, it had become clear that the Energiewende was not progressing at the anticipated speed, with the country's climate policy regarded as "lackluster" and the energy transition "stalling." High electricity prices, growing resistance against the use of wind turbines over their environmental and potential health impacts, and regulatory hurdles, have been identified as causes for this. As of 2017 Germany imported more than half of its energy.

A 2018 European Commission case study report on the Energiewende noted 27% decrease in  emissions against the 1990 levels with a slight increase over the few preceding years and concluded achieving of the intended 40% reduction target by 2020 in unfeasible, primarily due to the "simultaneous nuclear phase-out and increased energy consumption". Also 50% increase of electricity prices was observed (compared to base 2007 prices). Germany's energy sector remains the largest single source of  emissions, contributing over 40%.

In 2018 the slow-down of deployment of new renewable energy was partially attributed to high demand for land, which has been highlighted as a potential "downside" by a WWF report.

In March 2019, Chancellor Merkel formed a so-called climate cabinet to find a consensus on new emissions reduction measures to meet 2030 targets. The result was the Climate Action Program 2030, which Berlin adopted on 9 October 2019. The Program contains plans for a carbon pricing system for the heating and transportation sectors, which are not covered by the EU ETS. It also includes tax- and other incentives to encourage energy-efficient building renovations, higher EV subsidies, and more public transport investments. The IEA report concludes that "[t]he package represents a clear step in the right direction towards Germany meeting its 2030 targets." The German Coal Commission, composed of 28 industrial, environmental, and regional organizations, voted on the coal phase-out date. Ultimately, 27 members voted in favor of 2038 coal phase-out date, with only one regional organization from Lusatia voting against, and Greenpeace voting in favor and later releasing a non-binding "dissenting opinion".

As result of phasing out nuclear power and, in long term, coal, Germany declared increased reliance on fossil gas.

A similar statement was voiced by SPD MP Udo Bullmann who explained that Germany has to stick with fossil fuels as it's trying to replace both coal and nuclear "at the same time", while countries that rely on nuclear power have "easier task replacing fossil fuels". In 2020 Agora Energiewende also declared a number of new fossil gas plants will be also required to "guarantee supply security as Germany relies more and more on intermittent renewable electricity". In January 2019 Germany's Economy Minister Peter Altmaier he doesn't want to import "cheap nuclear power" from other countries to compensate for planned phase-out of coal. In 2021 Green MEP Sven Giegold admitted that Germany may require new fossil gas power plants in order to "stabilise the more fluctuating power supply of renewables".

The 2020 climate goals were successful in the following areas:
 closure of nuclear plants
 increasing renewable energy share
 reducing greenhouse gas emissions

The following climate goals however failed:
 increasing renewable energy share in the transport sector
 reducing primary energy consumption
 final energy productivity.
In 2020 a number of previously shut down fossil gas plants (Irsching units 4 and 5) were restarted due to "heavy fluctuations of level of power generated from the wind and sun" and a new fossil gas power plant was announced by RWE near the former Biblis nuclear power plant shut down in 2017. The project is declared as part of "decarbonization plan" where renewable energy capacity is accompanied by fossil gas plants to cover for intermittency. In 2020 a new coal power plant unit, Datteln 4, was also connected to the grid. A new fossil gas power plant will be also opened from 2023 in Leipheim, Bavaria to compensate for loss of power caused by "nuclear exit" in this region. In 2021, the planned decommissioning of Heyden 4 coal power plant was cancelled and the plant remains online to compensate for shutdown of the Grohnde nuclear power station. In 2022, another coal power plant was restarted in Schongau for the same reasons.

In June 2021 professor André Thess from Stuttgart university published an open letter accusing Klaus Töpfer and Matthias Kleiner, the authors of the 2011 Ethical Committee for Secure Energy Supply report that served as the scientific background of the "nuclear exit" decision, of disregarding the basic rules of scientific independence. The analysis promised that phase-out of nuclear energy and full transition to renewables "can be completed within a decade". Thess highlighted that the authors lacked the expertise necessary to properly understand and "balance between the risk of more rapid climate change without nuclear energy and the risk of slower climate change with nuclear energy".

High average amounts of wind in 2019 and 2020 were presented in Germany as a success of the renewables, but when the amount of wind was low for the first half of 2021, use of coal rose by 21% as compared to the previous years. In the first half of 2021 coal, gas and nuclear power delivered 56% of overall electricity in Germany, with proportionally higher  intensity due high inputs from coal and fossil gas. According to another analysis by Oekomoderne, in 2021 Germany produced nearly 260 TWh of electricity from coal in the first half of 2021, making it the single largest source of energy in that period — as it used "one billion tons" of coal.

This situation once again raised questions about the future of weather-dependent electricity system that is also highly dependent on fossil sources for stability and its contradiction with the initial objectives of decarbonization.

Projections Report published in 2021 predicted that Germany will miss its 2030 target by 16 percentage points (49% reduction vs 65% planned) and the 2040 target by 21 percentage points (67% vs 88% planned). Reduction of emissions in other sectors of the economy is also expected to miss the original targets.

In October 2021 over 20 climate scientists and activists signed an open letter to the German government to reconsider the nuclear exit as it will lead to emissions of extra 60 millions of tons of  each year and hinder decarbonization efforts even further.

The new coalition formed after the 2021 elections proposed earlier phase-out of coal and internal combustion cars by 2035, 65% energy generated from renewables by 2030 and 80% by 2040. In addition, 2% of land surface is to be set aside for on-shore wind power, and off-shore wind capacity is to be increased to 75 GW. Fossil gas role was reinforced as "indispensable" transition fuel with low-carbon nuclear power imported from France to ensure stability of supplies.

By end of 2021, the single largest source of electricity in Germany was coal (9.5% hard and 20.2% brown), increase of 20% compared to 2020 due to significant drop in wind (-14.5%) and solar (-5%) power output in that year. Solar power only produced 9.9% electricity, while nuclear power produced 13% even as it was going through the process of decommissioning.

In 2022 Agora Enegiewende warned that Germany has missed its 2020 emission targets and is likely going to miss the 2030 targets, and increase of total emissions after 2022 is likely. Previously celebrated 2020 record low emissions were described as one-off effect of favorable weather and lower demand due to COVID-19 pandemics. Nuclear phase-out, skyrocketing gas prices and low wind and solar output resulting in increased reliance on coal were also attributed to the increase in emissions.

In January 2022 the new coalition government reiterated its opposition to the inclusion of nuclear power in the EU sustainable taxonomy, but also requested that fossil gas is instead included as a "transitional" fuel and carbon intensity thresholds for gas are relaxed. As the subsidies for gas were ultimately upheld, a number of new fossil gas plants plan to benefit from the subsidies, while expecting increased profits thanks to "rising wholesale electricity prices" as result of "the last nuclear power plants to be removed from the grid" at the same time.

Following the 2022 Russian invasion of Ukraine, Germany announced they would re-open 10 GW of coal power to allegedly "conserve natural gas" following the recent shortage in Europe. This led to a subsequent criticism of Energiewende's strategy, and how this impacted different countries in Europe. Michael Kretschmer (CDU) declared the Energiewende to be a failure, highlighting that renewable generation is insufficient and baseload capabilities have reached its limits. He called for nuclear power phase-out to be cancelled and remaining reactors restarted, until a new feasible strategy is created.

From February 2022 there was a heated debate about pausing the nuclear phase-out and restarting still operational reactors in order to better cope with the energy crisis caused by the Russian invasion of Ukraine. Also in August 2022 German counter-intelligence started an investigation into two high-ranked officials at German ministry of energy suspected of representing interests of Russia.

In October 2022 Germany ministry of energy approved extension of RWE brown coal open pit mine in Lutzerath, claiming it's "necessary for energy security". In October 2022 the government also declared the still operational nuclear power plants will not be shut down by end of 2022, but will instead operate until 15 April to help cope with the electricity demand through the winter.

Criticism 

The Energiewende has been criticized for the high costs, the early nuclear phase-out which increased carbon emissions, continuation or even increase in use of fossil fuels, risks to power supply stability and the environmental damage of biomass.

German association of local utilities VKU said the strategy creates significant risks to the stability of power supply in case of "lengthy periods" of weather unsuitable for wind and solar generation since energy storage in Germany is "largely non-existent".

After introduction of the original Renewable Energy Act in 2000, there was a focus on long term costs, while in later years this has shifted to a focus on short term costs and the "financial burden" of the Energiewende while ignoring environmental externalities of fossil fuels.
Electricity prices for household customers in Germany have been generally increasing in the last decade.
The renewable energy levy to finance green power investment is added to Germans' electricity unit price. The surcharge (22.1% in 2016) pays the state-guaranteed price for renewable energy to producers and is 6.35 cents per kWh in 2016.

A comprehensive study, published in Energy Policy in 2013, reported that Germany's nuclear power phase-out, to be complete by 2022, is contradictory to the goal of the climate portion of the program. 

In June 2019, an open letter to "the leadership and people of Germany", written by almost 100 Polish environmentalists and scientist, urged Germany to "reconsider the decision on the final decommissioning of fully functional nuclear power plants" for the benefit of the fight against global warming.

Former German Economy and Energy Minister Sigmar Gabriel 2014 said "For a country like Germany with a strong industrial base, exiting nuclear and coal-fired power generation at the same time would not be possible." 

As nuclear and coal power plants are being phased out, the government has begun to promote the use of fossil gas in order to bridge the gap between other fossil fuels and low-carbon energy sources. This move has been criticised by international observers, who argue that fossil fuel gas is "essentially methane,  which constitutes at least one-third of global warming and is leaking into the atmosphere all across the gas production and delivery chain." It is also a more potent greenhouse gas than carbon-dioxide. It is also feared that the European Union, but particularly Germany, is making itself overly dependent on Russia for gas supplies via Nord Stream 2, thereby undermining its energy security. In light of the 2022 Russian invasion of Ukraine the Nord Stream 2 project was first postponed indefinitely and ultimately cancelled. The Scholz cabinet has spent considerable efforts since February 2022 to find replacements for Russian fossil gas both in the near and the long term.

Germany's electricity transmission network is currently inadequately developed, therefore lacking the capability of delivering offshore wind energy produced on the Northern coast to industrial regions in the country's South. The transmission system operators are planning to build 4000 additional kilometers of transmission lines until 2030.

Slow reduction of  emissions in Germany, especially in the energy sector, has been contrasted with France's successful decarbonization of its energy sector under the Messmer plan (from 1973) and the United Kingdom's carbon tax, which saw a drastic reduction of coal-powered energy from 88% in 1973 to below 1% in 2019.

German federal audit office report published in March 2021 highlighted very high costs of Energiewende for the household users, where taxes and fees account for 50% of the bills, and the energy price is 43% higher than the EU average. It also noted predicted shortage of 4.5 GW between 2022 and 2025 as result of planned shutdown of nuclear power plants.

A study found that if Germany had postponed the nuclear phase out and phased out coal first it could have saved 1,100 lives and €3 to €8 billion in social costs per year. The study concludes that policymakers would have to overestimate the risk or cost of a nuclear accident to conclude that the benefits of the phase-out exceed its social costs. An open letter by a number of climate scientists published in 2021 calls against the shut-down of the remaining nuclear reactors in Germany, that would lead to 5% increase in  emissions from the electricity sector.

Biomass 
Biomass made up 7.0% of Germany's power generation mix in 2017. Biomass has the potential to be a carbon-neutral fuel because growing biomass absorbs carbon dioxide from the atmosphere and a portion of the carbon absorbed remains in the ground after harvest. However, using biomass as a fuel produces air pollution in the form of carbon monoxide, carbon dioxide,  (nitrogen oxides), VOCs (volatile organic compounds), particulates and other pollutants, although biomass produces less sulfur dioxide than coal.

Between 2004 and 2011 policies lead to around 7000 km2 new maize-fields for biomass-energy by ploughing-up of at least 2700 km2 of permanent grassland. This released large amounts of climate active gases, loss of biodiversity and potential of groundwater recharge.

There are also attempts to use biogas as partially renewable fuel with Green Planet Energy selling gas containing 10% of biogas, 1% hydrogen and 90% imported fossil gas.

Citizen support and participation 

, citizen support for the Energiewende remained high, with surveys indicating that about 80–90% of the public are in favor.
One reason for the high acceptance was the substantial participation of German citizens in the Energiewende, as private households, land owners, or members of energy cooperatives (Genossenschaft).
A 2016 survey showed that roughly one in two Germans would consider investing in community renewable energy projects.
Manfred Fischedick, Director of the Wuppertal Institute for Climate, Environment and Energy has commented that "if people participate with their own money, for example in a wind or solar power plant in their area, they will also support [the Energiewende]." A 2010 study shows the benefits to municipalities of community ownership of renewable generation in their locality.
 Estimates for 2012 suggested that almost half the renewable energy capacity in Germany was owned by citizens through energy cooperatives and private initiatives. More specifically, citizens accounted for nearly half of all installed biogas and solar capacity and half of the installed onshore wind capacity.

According to a 2014 survey conducted by TNS Emnid for the German Renewable Energies Agency among 1015 respondents, 94 percent of the Germans supported the enforced expansion of Renewable Energies.  More than two-thirds of the interviewees agreed to renewable power plants close to their homes.
The share of total final energy from renewables was 11% in 2014.

However, changes in energy policy, starting with the Renewable Energy Sources Act in 2014, have jeopardized the efforts of citizens to participate. The share of citizen-owned renewable energy has since dropped to 42.5% as of 2016.

The Renewable Energy Sources Act provides compensation to wind turbine operators for every kilowatt-hour of electricity not produced if wind power surpasses peak grid capacity, while grid operators must splice electricity from renewable sources into the grid even in times of low or no demand for it. This can lead to a negative price of electricity, and grid operators may pass associated costs on to customers, estimated to be costing them an extra €4 billion in 2020. This has resulted in greater resistance to certain Energiewende policies, specifically wind power.

By 2019 Germany also saws a significant increase of organized opposition against on-shore wind farms, especially in Bavaria and Baden-Württemberg.

Computer studies 

Much of the policy development for the Energiewende is underpinned by computer models, run mostly by universities and research institutes.  The models are usually based on scenario analysis and are used to investigate different assumptions regarding the stability, sustainability, cost, efficiency, and public acceptability of various sets of technologies.  Some models cover the entire energy sector, while others are confined to electricity generation and consumption.  A 2016 book investigates the usefulness and limitations of energy scenarios and energy models within the context of the Energiewende.

A number of computer studies confirm the feasibility of the German electricity system being 100% renewable in 2050.  Some investigate the prospect of the entire energy system (all energy carriers) being fully renewable too.

2009 WWF study 

In 2009 WWF Germany published a quantitative study prepared by the Öko-Institut, Prognos, and Hans-Joachim Ziesing. 
The study presumes a 95% reduction in greenhouse gases by the year 2050 and covers all sectors.  The study shows that the transformation from a high-carbon to a low-carbon economy is possible and  affordable.  It notes that by committing to this transformation  path, Germany could become a model for other countries.

2011 German Advisory Council on the Environment study 

The German Aerospace Center (DLR) REMix high-resolution energy model was used for the analysis. A range of scenarios were investigated and a cost-competitive transition with good security of supply is possible.

The authors presume that the transmission network will continue to be reinforced and that cooperation with Norway and Sweden would allow their hydro generation to be used for storage.  The transition does not require Germany's nuclear phase-out to be extended nor the construction of coal-fired plants with carbon capture and storage (CCS).  Conventional generation assets need not be stranded and an orderly transition should prevail.  Stringent energy efficiency and energy saving programs can bring down the future costs of electricity.

2015 Deep Decarbonization Pathways Project study 

The Deep Decarbonization Pathways Project (DDPP) aims to demonstrate how countries can transform their energy systems by 2050 in order to achieve a low-carbon economy.
The 2015 German country report, produced in association with the Wuppertal Institute, examines the official target of reducing domestic GHG emissions by 80% to 95% by 2050 (compared with 1990).  Decarbonization  pathways  for  Germany  are  illustrated  by  means  of  three  ambitious scenarios with energy-related emission reductions between 1990 and 2050 varying between 80%  and  more  than  90%.  Three strategies strongly contribute to GHG emission reduction:
 energy efficiency improvements (in all sectors but especially in buildings)
 increased use of domestic renewables (with a focus on electricity generation)
In addition, some scenarios use controversially:
 final energy demand reductions through behavioral changes (modal shift in transport, changes in eating and heating habits)
 net imports of electricity from renewable sources or of bioenergy
 use of carbon capture and storage (CCS) technology to reduce industry sector GHG emissions (including cement production)
Potential co-benefits for Germany include increased energy security, higher competitiveness of and global business opportunities for companies, job creation, stronger GDP growth, smaller energy bills for households, and less air pollution.

2015 Fraunhofer ISE study 

Using the model REMod-D (Renewable Energy Model – Germany), this 2015 Fraunhofer ISE study investigates several system transformation scenarios and their related costs.  The guiding question of the study is: how can a cost-optimised transformation of the German energy system — with consideration of all energy carriers and consumer sectors — be achieved while meeting the declared climate protection targets and ensuring a secure energy supply at all times.  Carbon capture and storage (CCS) is explicitly excluded from the scenarios.  A future energy scenario emitting 85% less  emissions than 1990 levels is compared with a reference scenario, which assumes that the German energy system operates in 2050 the same way as it does today.  Under this comparison, primary energy supply drops 42%.  The total cumulative costs depend on the future prices for carbon and oil.  If the penalty for  emissions increases to €100/tonne by 2030 and thereafter remains constant and fossil fuel prices increase annually by 2%, then the total cumulative costs of today's energy system are 8% higher than the costs required for the minus 85% scenario up to 2050.  The report also notes:

2015 DIW study 

A 2015 study uses DIETER or Dispatch and Investment Evaluation Tool with Endogenous Renewables, developed by the German Institute for Economic Research (DIW), Berlin, Germany.  The study examines the power storage requirements for renewables uptake ranging from 60% to 100%.  Under the baseline scenario of 80% (the German government target for 2050), grid storage requirements remain moderate and other options on both the supply side and demand side offer flexibility at low cost.  Nonetheless, storage plays an important role in the provision of reserves.  Storage becomes more pronounced under higher shares of renewables, but strongly depends on the costs and availability of other flexibility options, particularly on biomass availability.  The model is fully described in the study report.

2016 acatech study 

A 2016 acatech-lead study focused on so-called flexibility technologies used to balance the fluctuations inherent in power generation from wind and photovoltaics.  Set in 2050, several scenarios use gas power plants to stabilise the backbone of energy system, ensuring supply security during several weeks of low wind and solar radiation.  Other scenarios investigate a 100% renewable system and show these to be possible but more costly.  Flexible consumption and storage control (demand-side management) in households and the industrial sector is the most cost-efficient means of balancing short-term power fluctuations.  Long-term storage systems, based on power-to-X, are only viable if carbon emissions are to be reduced by more than 80%.  On the question of costs, the study notes:

2016 Stanford University study 

The Atmosphere/Energy Program at Stanford University has developed roadmaps for 139 countries to achieve energy systems powered only by wind, water, and sunlight (WWS) by 2050.  In the case of Germany, total end-use energy drops from 375.8 GW for business-as-usual to 260.9 GW under a fully renewable transition.  Load shares in 2050 would be: on-shore wind 35%, off-shore wind 17%, wave 0.08%, geothermal 0.01%, hydro-electric 0.87%, tidal 0%, residential PV 6.75%, commercial PV 6.48%, utility PV 33.8%, and concentrating solar power 0%.  The study also assess avoided air pollution, eliminated global climate change costs, and net job creation.  These co-benefits are substantial.

See also 

 Bundesnetzagentur
 Electricity sector in Germany
 Energieeinsparverordnung – German building energy regulations
 Energy in Germany
 Energy modeling
 Federal Network Agency
 Fossil fuel phase-out
 The Fourth Revolution: Energy
 German Renewable Energy Act
 German Solar Industry Association
 Germany National Renewable Energy Action Plan
 KfW IPEX-Bank
 List of countries by renewable electricity production
 Low-carbon economy
 Passivhaus
 Renewable energy commercialization
 Renewable energy in Germany
 Renewable energy in the European Union
 Soft energy path
 Wildpoldsried
 Greenpeace Energy

References

Further reading 
 Energy Concept for an Environmentally Sound, Reliable and Affordable Energy Supply, 28 September 2010 (English translation of the German policy document)

External links 
 Clean Energy Wire (CLEW) – a news service covering the energy transition in Germany
 Energy Topics – hosted by the Federal Ministry for Economic Affairs and Energy (BMWi)
 German Energy Blog – a legal blog covering the Energiewende
 German Energy Transition – a comprehensive website maintained by the Heinrich Böll Foundation
 Presentation (30:47) by Amory Lovins to the Berlin Energy Transition Dialogue 2016, 17–18 March 2016
 Strom-Report.de – a statistics website covering renewable energy topics as well as the energy transition in Germany

Emissions reduction
Climate change in Germany
Energy in Germany
Transition
Renewable energy commercialization
Renewable energy in Germany